80/35 Music Festival is a multi-day music festival in Des Moines, Iowa. The name comes from two prominent interstates, I-80 and I-35, which intersect in Des Moines. The festival includes a stage for national touring bands and several smaller stages featuring regional and local supporting acts. In addition to music there are booths for local organizations, interactive art, food and beverage sales, and resting places.

The festival brings an estimated attendance of over 30,000 people annually since 2008. More than 45 acts are featured each year. Past headliners have included The Flaming Lips, The Roots, Public Enemy, Modest Mouse, The Avett Brothers, David Byrne & St. Vincent, Wu-Tang Clan, and Weezer.

The festival is nearly 100% volunteer run and is organized by the Greater Des Moines Music Coalition, a 501(c)(3) non-profit committed to building a stronger and more diverse live music economy in greater Des Moines.

Lineups

2019 
Hy-Vee Main Stage

Friday, July 12: Elle King, Metric, YUNGBLUD
Saturday, July 13: Portugal. The Man, MisterWives, Noname (cancelled due to health concerns), Liz Phair, Dessa, Sadat X & El w/ DJ Kaos, And The Kids

Kum & Go Stage

Friday, July 12: Lissie, Murder By Death
Saturday, July 13: Open Mike Eagle, The Beths, The Harmaleighs, Sidewalk Chalk, Dressy Bessy

Nationwide Stage

Friday, July 12: Josh Hoyer & Soul Colossal, MarKaus, Squirrel Flower, Hex Girls, Closed Format presents Disco Demolition
Saturday, July 13: The Envy Corps, DICKIE, Druids, LAV.ISH, Crystal City, The Other Brothers, Younger, Left Is West, Lady Revel, DJ Raj and Friends

Gen Z Showcase

Friday, July 12: Queen Kenzie, Plumero, Jolie Seitz
Saturday, July 13: COLDSAINT, EleanorGrace, Greta & Adaline Akers, Girls Rock! DSM, DMMC Summer Camps: Hip-Hop, DMMC Summer Camps: Rock

2018 
Hy-Vee Main Stage

Friday, July 6: Phoebe Bridgers, Atmosphere, Phantogram
Saturday, July 7: Field Division, Vagabon, BJ The Chicago Kid, Car Seat Headrest, Courtney Barnett, Kesha

Kum & Go Stage

Friday, July 6: Pink Neighbor, Nnamdi Ogbonnaya, Remo Drive, Jeff Rosenstock, Closed Format
Saturday, July 7: Honeycreeper, Naked Giants, Greg Grease, Sawyer Fredericks, Ratboys, Zeshan B, Soccer Mommy, Priscilla Renea, The Poison Control Center, BassRaja and Pri yon Joni with Himanshu on Dhol

Nationwide Stage

Friday, July 6: Da Younger, Matthew James & The Rust Belt Union, Closet Witch, Elizabeth Moen
Saturday, July 7: Comandante, Starry Nights, Foxholes, Ramona & the Sometimes, Karen Meat, The Host Country, Extravision, Telekinetic Yeti, B.Well

2017 
Hy-Vee Main Stage
Friday, July 7: Elephant Revival, Charles Bradley & His Extraordinaires, MGMT
Saturday, July 8: prettygirlhatemachine, Coral Creek, Hop Along, The Maytags, The Motet, The Shins

Kum & Go Stage
Friday, July 7: Lily DeTaeye, The Suburbs, Pigeons Playing Ping Pong, Bully, Closed Format
Saturday, July 8: Closet Witch, ZULUZULUU, Bad Bad Hats, WebsterX, Henhouse Prowlers, A Giant Dog, Modern Life Is War, Diarrhea Planet, Chicano Batman, DJ Apollo, DJ Chris Coffey, BassRaja

Nationwide Stage
Friday, July 7: The Vahnevants, Elizabeth Moen, MarKaus, Radio Moscow
Saturday, July 8: Glitter Density, Stutterin' Jimmy & The Goosebumps, Aaron Earl Short, Traffic Death, Ancient Posse, Tha Füt, Dan Tedesco, Trevor Sensor, Middle Western
Coca-Cola Gen Z Showcase
Friday, July 7: Jackson Overton & Tyler Fraaken, Trevor Lambert, Comandante Marcos
Saturday, July 8: DMMC Summer Camps, Girls Rock! Des Moines, Serenade Your Mother, Queen Kenzie, The Yelps

2016 
Hy-Vee Main Stage
Friday, July 8: Wolf Parade, Lotus, Nas
Saturday, July 9: TWINS, Druids, Thao & The Get Down Stay Down, Jeff Austin Band, Black Lips, The Decemberists

Kum & Go Stage
Friday, July 8: Courtney Krause, The Pistol Whippin Party Penguins, Dilly Dally, Craig Finn, Jeana Calvert, Jade Reed b2b Brad Goldman
Saturday, July 9: Odd Pets, Genome, Ravyn Lenae, France Camp, Mikel Wright & The Wrongs, Vic Spencer, Colleen Green, Lucky Chops, Lizzo, Dem Boyz vs RAGEthat, DJ RAJ and Strobe Trotters

Nationwide Stage
Friday, July 8: The Smoothsayers, TIRES, MarKaus, Holy White Hounds
Saturday, July 9: FRO, Easy Fruit, The Dead Line String Band, The Cardinal Sound, Goldblums, SIRES, MaZoo, MAIDS, Green Death

2015 
Hy-Vee Main Stage
Friday, July 10: St. Lucia, Jenny Lewis, Wilco
Saturday, July 11: Canby, Jon Wayne and the Pain, Cloud Nothings, Lettuce, Run The Jewels, Weezer

Kum & Go Stage
Friday, July 10: Rome Fortune, Fly Golden Eagle, Hot Buttered Rum, Talib Kweli, Jade Reed and Tobias Cross, RackCity and Brad Goldman
Saturday, July 11: Boh Doran, Kind Country, The Kickback, Amasa Hines, Jaden Carlson Band, Natural Child, Empires, Head for the Hills, The Orwells, Jesse Jamz, DJ RAJ, Dem Boyz

Nationwide Stage
Friday, July 10: Field Division, Karen Meat & the Computer, Mighty Shady, Asphate, Damon Dotson
Saturday, July 11: Fuzzy Logic, The Olympics, prettygirlhatemachine, The High Crest, Parranderos Latin Combo, Brazilian 2wins, Christopher the Conquered, Annalibera, The Maytags

2014 
Main Stage
 Friday, July 4: Brother Trucker, Gloom Balloon, Dawes, Best Coast, Ziggy Marley, Conor Oberst
 Saturday, July 5: Boy & Bear, Raz Simone, The Envy Corps, Xavier Rudd, Dr. Dog, Cake

Kum & Go Stage
 Friday, July 4: Quick Piss, Fury Things, Chicago Farmer, TREE, Circle of Heat, Black Diet, Pert Near Sandstone, The Hooten Hallers, Surfer Blood, JohnnyRAGE, Gorilla Stomp Squad
 Saturday, July 5: Dat Dude Biggz, Har-di-Har, Soap, Shy Boys, Useful Jenkins, The Whigs, Caroline Smith, King Fantastic, Those Darlins, DJ Raj, Jesse Jamz

Hy-Vee Stage
 Friday, July 4: M34n Str33t, Fire Sale, TWINS, Cirrus Minor, Bonne Finken, GoodcaT, MAIDS, Max Jury, The River Monks, DJ G Mint, Brad Goldman and Tobias Cross present CLIMAX
 Saturday, July 5: Volcano Boys, Zeta June, Foxholes, Kris Adams, James Biehn, Parlours, Aquamarine Dream Machine, Holy White Hounds, The Maytags, Shawn Shady, Cloudy with a Chance of Techno, TimeWlkr

2013 

Main Stage
 Friday, July 5: Tea Leaf Green, Yeasayer, David Byrne & St. Vincent
 Saturday, July 6: Dylan Sires & Neighbors, Mr. Baber’s Neighbors, Wavves, Umphrey's McGee, Deerhunter, Wu-Tang Clan

Kum & Go Stage
 Friday, July 5: Annalibera, Kitty Pryde, Roster McCabe, Menomena, SUBliminal Chaos, Jesse Jamz, DJ Bui
 Saturday, July 6: Gloom Balloon, Prissy Clerks, Escondido, Water Liars, The Homemade Jamz Blues Band, Apollo Brown & Guilty Simpson, Strange Names, Jon Wayne & the Pain, House of Large Sizes, DJ Cosmo, The Baloney Bros, DJ Flash

Hy-Vee Stage
 Friday, July 5: Emperors Club, Dusting Smith & The Sunday Silos, Maxilla Blue, Euforquestra, The Other Elements, M34N STR33T, Richie Daggers w/ Gadema
 Saturday, July 6: Mighty Shady, Uniphonics, H.D. Harmsen, SP3, Tires, Trouble Lights, The River Monks, Mumford’s, The Pines, I AM ZERO, Patient Zero, I AM ZERO

2012 

Wellmark Blue Cross Blue Shield Main Stage
 Friday, July 6: Fucked Up, Dinosaur Jr., The Avett Brothers
 Saturday, July 7: Christopher the Conquered & His Black Gold Brass Band, Greensky Bluegrass, Atmosphere, Leftover Salmon, Death Cab for Cutie

Hy-Vee Triathlon Stage
 Friday, July 6: Tajh, Bright Giant, Pieta Brown
 Saturday, July 7: Little Ruckus, The Sun Company, Mumford’s, Maxilla Blue, The Sundogs, Mantis Pincers, Leslie and the LY's, Dead Larry

Kum & Go Stage
 Friday, July 6: Dustin Smith & The Sunday Silos, Dumptruck Butterlips, Useful Jenkins, Freddie Gibbs, DJ Eight Ten, Alex Brown, John Solarz
 Saturday, July 7: Derek Lambert and the Prairie Fires, Now Now, Delta Rae, Mark Mallman, Night Moves, Jaill, Jason Isbell and The 400 Unit, K-Holes, Dan Deacon, Jade Reed, Jesse Jamz, Brad Goldman

2011 
Main Stage
 Saturday, July 2: The Chatty Cathys, The Reverend Peyton's Big Damn Band, Titus Andronicus, Edward Sharpe and the Magnetic Zeros, Galactic, Girl Talk
 Sunday, July 3: Rebel Creek, Yelawolf, Karl Denson's Tiny Universe, Okkervil River, Grace Potter and the Nocturnals, of Montreal

Kum & Go Stage
 Saturday, July 2: Wolfgang, NewVillager, Generationals, Cory Chisel and The Wandering Sons, The Junkyard Orchestra, BBU, Bitch, Jessica Lea Mayfield, Blackalicious
 Sunday, July 3: Infantree, Bear Hands, The Giving Tree Band, Pink Mink, Gold Motel, Civil Twilight, WhiteWater Ramble, Handsome Furs, The Macpodz

Local Stage
 Saturday, July 2: Grinning Match, Wolves in the Attic, La Strange, Brother Trucker, Christopher the Conquered, Thankful Dirt, Cashes Rivers, The Poison Control Center, Mr. Baber's Neighbors
 Sunday, July 3: Love Songs for Lonely Monsters, Land of Blood and Sunshine, The Uniphonics, The River Monks, DCM, The Workshy, Parlours, & The Body Electric , The Envy Corps

2010 
Wellmark Blue Cross Blue Shield Main Stage
 Saturday, July 4: Omega Dog, Particle, Yo La Tengo, Slightly Stoopid, Spoon
 Sunday, July 5: The Workshy, Avi Buffalo, The Walkmen, Railroad Earth, The Cool Kids, Modest Mouse

Kum & Go Stage
 Saturday, July 4: Modern Day Satire, Canby, Psalm One, Cashes Rivers, Zola Jesus, Solid Gold, William Elliott Whitmore, Earl Greyhound, Holly Golightly & The Brokeoffs 
 Sunday, July 5: Dawes, Family Groove Company, Christopher the Conquered, Sara Watkins, Evangelicals, Califone, Dar Williams, The Heavy

Mediacom Stage
 Saturday, July 4: Adapt, Flatform, El Guante, Tim Grimes, W.A.S.T.E.L.A.N.D.S., Mustafa Avdic, St. Paul Slim, Oz & Dave Leo, Tripp Marxx
 Sunday, July 5: Cleo’s Apartment, Kanser, Raj w/ Leeman, DJ Diverse, Maxilla Blue, Qwel, Brad Goldman & Mimic

2009 
Wellmark Blue Cross Blue Shield Main Stage
 Friday, July 3: Tilly and the Wall, Matisyahu, Stephen Malkmus and The Jicks, Public Enemy
 Saturday, July 4: Poison Control Center, New Monsoon, Man Man, G. Love & Special Sauce, Broken Social Scene, Ben Harper and Relentless7

Mediacom East Stage
 Friday, July 3: William Fitzsimmons, Modern Skirts, Maps And Atlases, The Nadas, House of Large Sizes
 Saturday, July 4: Hanwell, Beati Paoli, Miss Derringer, Audrye Sessions, The Josh Davis Band, Wild Sweet Orange, Cleo's Apartment, Mr. Baber's Neighbors, Brother Ali

Meredith West Stage
 Friday, July 3: Mooseknuckle, The Dig Angees, The Autumn Project, Occidental Brothers, Public Property, DJ Diverse, Brad Goldman and Jade Reed
 Saturday, July 4: Anni Rossi, Baby Teeth, Paper Route, Girl in a Coma, Floodplane, Cymbals Eat Guitars, Margot & the Nuclear So and So's, The Envy Corps, All Bugs, Al Brown, Flatform

2008 

Main Stage
 Friday, July 4: Des Moines Boyz, Ingrid Michaelson, Andrew Bird, The Flaming Lips
 Saturday, July 5: Public Property, Dirty Little Rabbits, Drive-By Truckers, Jakob Dylan, Black Francis, Yonder Mountain String Band, The Roots

East Stage
 Friday, July 4: Headlights, Euforquestra, Diplomats of Solid Sound, Mr. Baber’s Neighbors
 Saturday, July 5: David Zollo and The Body Electric, North of Grand, Neva Dinova, The Autumn Project, Brother Trucker, Family Groove Company, Poison Control Center, Pieta Brown

West Stage
 Friday, July 4: The Dig Angees, Colourmusic, Rock Plaza Central, Cracker
 Saturday, July 5: The Vandon Arms, GaiDen Gadema, Deanna Devore, KaiserCartel, MooseKnuckle, Ezra Furman & The Harpoons, Maxilla Blue, Radio Moscow, The Envy Corps

DJ Stage
 Friday, July 4: Al Brown, Flatform
 Saturday, July 5: DJ Flash, Jade Reed, TouchNice, Tim Grimes, Brad Goldman, DJ Diverse

References

External links

  
 Greater Des Moines Music Coalition

Rock festivals in the United States
Tourist attractions in Des Moines, Iowa
Music festivals in Iowa
Music festivals established in 2008
Pop music festivals in the United States
2008 establishments in Iowa